The following are the national records in athletics in Malawi maintained by Athletics Association of Malawi (AAM).

Outdoor

Key to tables:

+ = en route to a longer distance

h = hand timing

Men

Women

Indoor

Men

Women

References

Malawi
Records
Athletics